Eduardo Daniel Bogado (born 1979) is a British - Paraguayan documentary producer and director, who has worked with Channel 4, including its series Dispatches. He has won several awards for his documentaries in Africa, highlighting problems with communities in several countries.

Career
In 2012, Bogado won the Rory Peck Sony Impact award for "Terror in Sudan", a documentary describing human rights abuse in Sudan by the Government of Omar al-Bashir. The documentary showed Bogado and reporter Aidan Hartley watching a series of Antonov military aircraft circling the area of the Nuba Mountains where filming took place. As well as the Rory Peck award, it also received a nomination at the following year's Royal Television Society Independent Spirit awards.

In 2014, Bogado filmed "Nigeria's Hidden War" for Channel 4's Dispatches series, showing unwarranted violence by the Nigerian government towards civilians as part of its struggle against the extremist group Boko Haram. The documentary was nominated for the Foreign Press Associated Feature Award and the following year it won Broadcast Best Current Affairs Programme. A US version of the documentary was made for PBS Frontline and won an Emmy Award for Best Investigative Journalism in a News Magazine.

In 2014, he produced and directed "15 and Learning to Speak", a story about a deaf teenager in Uganda who is taught sign language for the first time in his life. Bogado chose to film in the country because he had heard there was significant stigma there about deaf children and decided it would be a wonderful idea to film a deaf child learning to communicate. His visit was well received by local children. A five-minute clip from the film was broadcast on the social media sites YouTube and Facebook, quickly gaining widespread support, with favourable comments on Twitter.

More recently, Bogado series directed Netflix's new seven-part Brazilian true-crime series on Wallace Souza, called "Killer Ratings" (Bandidos Na TV). Bogado said, “What I thought I knew about Wallace Souza when I set out, turned out only to be the starting point of this extraordinary story. When I looked deeper, I saw the events that followed were full of the most jaw-dropping turns, twists and shocks which would be deemed too outlandish in a Hollywood script.”

In 2021, Bogado directed 9/11: One Day in America, a documentary series for National Geographic revolving around the 9/11 terrorist attacks.

References

External links
 Official website

British journalists
British documentary film directors
Living people
1979 births